Carinostoma elegans is an harvestmen species in the genus Carinostoma found in  Hungary.

References

Harvestmen
Animals described in 1894
Arachnids of Europe